Rock & Roll is the fifth album by American psychedelic rock band Vanilla Fudge, released in September 1969. It peaked at No. 34 on the Billboard album charts in October of that year. The album was the band's last studio album prior to their initial break-up in the spring of 1970.

Track listing

Side one 
"Need Love" (Carmine Appice, Tim Bogert, Vince Martell, Mark Stein) - 4:57
"Lord in the Country" (Stein) - 4:30
"I Can't Make It Alone" (Gerry Goffin, Carole King) - 4:45
"Street Walking Woman" (Appice, Bogert, Martell, Stein) - 6:00 (original LP, 1998 and 2013 CD) / 6:10 (1991 CD)

Side two 
"Church Bells of St. Martins" (Stein) - 4:40
"The Windmills of Your Mind" (Alan Bergman, Marilyn Bergman, Michel Legrand) - 8:52 (original LP, 1998 and 2013 CD) / 6:03 (1991 CD)
"If You Gotta Make a Fool of Somebody" (Rudy Clark) - 6:00

1991 Repertoire Records CD bonus tracks
"Good Good Lovin'" (Appice, Bogert, Martell, Stein) - 2:59
"Shotgun" (7" version) (Autry DeWalt) - 2:27
"Where Is My Mind" (Stein) – 2:39
"Need Love" (7" version) (Appice, Bogert, Martell, Stein) - 2:39

1998 Sundazed Music CD bonus track
"Break Song" (studio version) (Appice, Bogert, Martell, Stein) - 19:57

2013 Esoteric Recordings CD bonus tracks
"All In Your Mind" (Appice, Bogert, Martell, Stein) - 2:59
"Need Love" (Mono Single Version) (Appice, Bogert, Martell, Stein) - 2:40
"I Can't Make It Alone" (Single Version) (Gerry Goffin, Carole King) – 3:37
"Lord In The Country" (Single Version) (Stein) - 3:02

Personnel
Carmine Appice - drums, lead vocals on track 7
Tim Bogert - bass guitar, backing vocals
Vince Martell - guitar, lead vocals on track 1,4
Mark Stein - keyboards, lead vocals on track 2, 3, 5, 6

References 

Vanilla Fudge albums
1969 albums
Atco Records albums

cs:Rock & Roll